María Concepción Paredes Tamayo (19 July 1970 – 22 June 2019) was a Spanish athlete who specialised in the triple jump. She represented her country at the 1996 Summer Olympics, as well as three outdoor and four indoor World Championships.

Her personal bests in the event are 14.30 metres outdoors (+1.8 m/s, Segovia 1994) and 14.09 metres indoors (Seville 1999). In addition, she has a long jump personal best of 6.30 metres (+1.4, León 1991).

Competition record

References

External links

1970 births
2019 deaths
People from Palencia
Sportspeople from the Province of Palencia
Spanish female triple jumpers
Place of death missing
Olympic athletes of Spain
Athletes (track and field) at the 1996 Summer Olympics
World Athletics Championships athletes for Spain
Athletes (track and field) at the 1997 Mediterranean Games
Mediterranean Games competitors for Spain